The Ladins are an ethnic group in northern Italy. They are distributed in several valleys, collectively known as Ladinia. These include the valleys of Badia and Gherdëina in South Tyrol, of Fassa in the Trentino, and Livinallongo (also known as Buchenstein or Fodom) and Ampezzo in the Province of Belluno. Their native language is Ladin, a Rhaeto-Romance language related to the Swiss Romansh and Friulian languages. They are part of Tyrol, with which they share culture, history, traditions, environment, and architecture.

Ladins developed a national ethnic identity in the 19th century. Micurà de Rü undertook the first attempt to develop a written form of the Ladin language. Nowadays, Ladin culture is promoted by the government-sponsored cultural institute Istitut Ladin Micurà de Rü in the South Tyrolean municipality of San Martin de Tor. There is also a Ladin museum in the same municipality. The Ladins of Trentino and Belluno have their own cultural institutes, Majon de Fascegn in Vigo di Fassa, Cesa de Jan in Colle Santa Lucia, and Istituto Ladin de la Dolomites in Borca di Cadore.

The Ladin people constitute only 4.53% of the population of South Tyrol. Many of the South Tyrolean Sagas come from the Ladin territory, including the national epic of the Ladin people, the saga of the Kingdom of Fanes. Another figure from Ladin mythology is the demon Anguana.

Communities

{| class="wikitable sortable" style="text-align:left"
|- style="background-color:#efefef;"
! align="center" | LadinName || align="center" | ItalianName || align="center" | GermanName || align="center" | Province || align="center" | Area(km²) || align="center" | Population
|-
| Anpezo
| Cortina d’Ampezzo
| Hayden
| Belluno
| align=right|255
| align=right|6,150
|-
| Urtijëi
| Ortisei
| St. Ulrich in Gröden
| South Tyrol
| align=right|24
| align=right|4,569
|-
| Badia
| Badia
| Abtei
| South Tyrol
| align=right|82
| align=right|3,237
|-
| Mareo
| Marebbe
| Enneberg
| South Tyrol
| align=right|161
| align=right|2,684
|-
| Moéna
| Moena
| Moena
| Trentino
| align=right|82
| align=right|2,628
|-
| Sëlva
| Selva di Val Gardena
| Wolkenstein in Gröden
| South Tyrol
| align=right|53
| align=right|2,589
|-
| Poza
| Pozza di Fassa
| Potzach im Fassatal
| Trentino
| align=right|73
| align=right|1,983
|-
| Cianacei
| Canazei
| Kanzenei
| Trentino
| align=right|67
| align=right|1,844
|-
| Santa Cristina Gherdëina
| Santa Cristina Valgardena
| St. Christina in Gröden
| South Tyrol
| align=right|31
| align=right|1,840
|-
| San Martin de Tor
| San Martino in Badia
| St. Martin in Thurn
| South Tyrol
| align=right|76
| align=right|1,727
|-
| Fodom
| Livinallongo del Col di Lana
| Buchenstein
| Belluno
| align=right|99
| align=right|1,436
|-
| Corvara
| Corvara
| Kurfar
| South Tyrol
| align=right|42
| align=right|1,266
|-
| La Val
| La Valle
| Wengen
| South Tyrol
| align=right|39
| align=right|1,251
|-
| Låg
| Laghetti
| Laag
| South Tyrol
| align=right|23
| align=right|1,284
|-
| Vich
| Vigo di Fassa
| Vig im Fassatal
| Trentino
| align=right|26
| align=right|1,142
|-
| Ciampedèl
| Campitello di Fassa
| Kampidel im Fassatal
| Trentino
| align=right|25
| align=right|732
|-
| Sorèga
| Soraga
| Überwasser
| Trentino
| align=right|19
| align=right|677
|-
| Mazin
| Mazzin
| Mazzin
| Trentino
| align=right|23
| align=right|440
|-
| Col
| Colle Santa Lucia
| Verseil
| Belluno
| align=right|15
| align=right|418
|}

Gallery

Notable Persons
 Maria Canins, Cyclist (twice winner of the Tour de France Féminin), cross-country skier (15 times national champion) and mountain runner.
 Nicol Delago, professional alpine skier 
 Giorgio Moroder, singer, songwriter, DJ and record producer
 Ettore Sottsass, photographer, architect and designer
 Carolina Kostner, figure skater, 2014 Olympic bronze medalist, 2012 World champion, and five-time European champion.
 Simon Kostner, ice hockey player, represented the Italian national team in several tournaments.
 Erwin Kostner, ice hockey player, competed in the men's tournament at the 1984 Winter Olympics.
 Kristian Ghedina, World Cup alpine ski racer whose thirteen victories are the most by an Italian downhill specialist in World Cup history.
 Simona Senoner, cross-country racer and ski jumper
 Peter Runggaldier, professional Alpine skier

See also
 The Ladinian Age in the Triassic Period of geological time is named for the Ladin people
Nones dialect

Further reading
Tobia Moroder (Ed.): The Ladins of the Dolomites. People, landscape, culture. Vienna/Bozen: Folio 2016,

References

External links
 Istitut Cultural Ladin Micurà de Rü (in South Tyrol), official site
 Istitut Cultural Ladin Majon di Fascegn (in Trentino), official site
 Istitut Cultural Ladin Cesa de Jan (in Belluno province), official site

Ladin people
Ethnic groups in Italy
Romance peoples
South Tyrol